Stephen Tyng Mather High School (commonly known as simply Mather) is a public 4–year high school located in the West Ridge neighborhood on the north side of Chicago, Illinois, United States. Opened in 1959, Mather is operated by the Chicago Public Schools (CPS) district. Mather is named in honor of Stephen Mather, an industrialist and conservationist who became the first director of the National Park Service.

Background

Campus and Faculty
Mather is a neighborhood high school with a college preparatory emphasis. More than 75% of students speak a language other than English at home. Mather's Bilingual/English as a Second Language (ESL) program is central to the school's curriculum. The faculty and staff reflect the multicultural backgrounds of Mather's students and serve as translators, role models, and mentors. Mather is committed to creating an environment that fosters student achievement. Honors-level classes are available for qualified students. The school campus shares two acres (56,000 m2) with adjacent Mather Park. The school has teachers fluent in languages such as Chinese, Arabic, Assyrian, Spanish, Russian, Serbo-Croat, Gujarati, and Urdu.

Academics
Advanced placement (AP) classes are offered:

Art/Studio Art 
English Language and Composition
English Literature and Composition 
U.S. History
U.S. Government
World History
Calculus AB
Chemistry 
Biology
Statistics
Psychology
Physics 
Spanish

Virtual High School classes are offered in a wide variety of subjects at various ability levels.

Athletics
Mather competes in the Chicago Public League (CPL) and is a member of the Illinois High School Association (IHSA). The school sport teams are nicknamed the Rangers. The boys' baseball team were public league champions in 1966–67. The boys' cross country team were regional champs in (2011–12, 2012–13, 2015–16)The girls' soccer team were public league champions in 2000–01. During the 2000–01 season, The girls' softball team were Class AA and public league champions. The girls' volleyball team were Class AA and public league champions twice (1995–96, 2001–02). The school's chess team were Class AA champions in 1991–92. The boys' soccer team were public league champions five times (1983–84, 1985–86, 1988–89, 2000–01, 2011–12) and State champions once (2011–12). The boys' golf team were public league champions in 1974. The boys' tennis team were public league champions twice (1973–74, 1974–75).

Notable alumni

 Robert Berland (1980) – judoka and coach who became the first American to receive as high as a silver medal in Olympic judo, winning the silver medal at the 1984 Olympics.
 Mun Choi – Current President of the University of Missouri
 Stephen Elliott (1990) – brother of William Elliott and author (Happy Baby).
 Noah Falstein (1975) – Pioneer game developer of games such as Sinistar and Indiana Jones and the Fate of Atlantis
 Frank Klopas (1983) – former soccer player, coach, and television broadcaster.  He played on the U.S. national soccer team in the 1988 Olympics and the 1994 FIFA World Cup.
 Qudus Lawal (2012) - Professional soccer player who led Mather to state and city championships.
 Max Levchin (1993) – internet entrepreneur who founded PayPal, Slide.com, and Affirm.
 Harry Rushakoff (1977) - Former drummer for the band Concrete Blonde.
 Ira I. Silverstein (1979) – member of the Illinois Senate (1999–2019).

Bus routes 
CTA
11 Lincoln
84 Peterson
93 California/Dodge (Monday–Saturday only)

References

External links
  Official website

Public high schools in Chicago
Educational institutions established in 1959
1959 establishments in Illinois